Anjwa-myeon (Korean: , hanja: 安佐面), is a myeon located in Sinan County, South Jeolla, South Korea. It has an area of 59.97 km2 and its population in 2021 was 2,700.

It includes Banwol island (Korean: , hanja: 半月島) and Bakji island (also known as Parkji Island, Korean: , hanja: 朴只島), which have been given the name the Purple Isles. Each island forms a ri in its own right within Anjwa-myeon. The Banwol island is a farming community with 21,500 m2 of lavender fields. The purple flowers inspired a rebrand for the region, with 400 buildings in the region painting their roofs purple, as well as telephone boxes. Since the initial painting in 2018, more than 490,000 visitors had come to the island as of 2021. The Banwol island and Bakji island are connected by a large purple bridge.

References

Towns and townships in South Korea